Thrissur railway station (station code:- TCR) is a railway station in Kerala, India. Thrissur also is known as the Cultural Capital of Kerala. Thrissur railway station is a major railway head in South India and A1 classified station operated by the Southern Railway zone of the Indian Railways and comes under the Thiruvananthapuram railway division. It is the busiest railway station in Kerala state in terms of rail traffic with 189 halting trains. At  in financial year 2018–19, it is the fourth largest in terms of passenger revenues in Kerala and the eighth largest in Southern Railway. Daily trains are available to Mumbai, New Delhi, Kolkata, Bangalore, Chennai, Mangalore, and Hyderabad.
This station lies on the Shoranur–Cochin Harbour section, which is one of the busiest railway corridors in Kerala. It has three satellite stations, Punkunnam railway station and two minor stations, Ollur railway station and Mulankunnathukavu railway station. Thrissur railway station also connects to the temple town of Guruvayur by Thrissur–Guruvayur section.

Layout
The station has four platforms and two entrances, one at the eastern side which is the main entrance and the second one at western side which was opened in 2010. The station can be easily accessed from Kottappuram side and the KSRTC transport bus stand side. It has three railway over bridges connecting first platform to the second, third and fourth platforms. The station operate passenger trains and goods trains.

Facilities

 Tickets
The station has five counters for non-reservation tickets in the east side, two ticket counters in the west side and ten automatic ticket vending machines (ATVM) in east also.  The reservation counters for the long-distance is situated in the eastern side with four counters in a separate building.

 Waiting halls
The station has an air-conditioned and non-air-conditioned waiting hall for first-class and sleeper class passengers. The round-the-clock air-conditioned waiting hall is maintained with the cooperation of the Kudumbasree Mission. The hall has facilities such as TV, toilet, library, and kids entertainment section are there.

 Google free Wi-Fi
The passengers can access free Wi-fi facility inside the station provided by Google and railwire

 Retiring rooms
The station has four retiring beds in air conditioned Double Bed category (Season price: 840, Non-Season price: 700); eight beds in air-conditioned Dormitory category (S-240, NS180) and one Non-air conditioned Single Bed category (S-390, NS-325).

 Parking
Paid four wheeler and two-wheeler parking is available in the east and west entrance of the station. Pre-paid autorickshaw services are also made to the passengers.

 Food
The station also provides vegetarian and non-vegetarian food through the 1,830 sqft multi-cuisine food plaza.

 Foot overbridges
The station has three foot overbridges. One in the centre of the station and second and third in the south and north of the station.

There is a computer-controlled coach guidance system and a plasma screen for display of information to passengers.

Other facilities available are Parcel booking office, Railway Mailing service (RMS) office, State Bank of India and Canara Bank Automated teller machine (ATMs).

Railway Police Station
Thrissur railway station has a railway police station with a Circle Inspector as the head and one Sub Inspectors. For the security of passengers, the Indian Railways have installed 21 high definition cameras which cover all the platforms and the ticket counters which is connected to the main system. There are two 42 inch LCD monitors which monitor all the visuals in the station.

Future expansion plans
The Southern Railways is planning to quadruple the Shoranur–Cochin Harbour section by setting up a third and fourth line. The new line will cater to the International Container Transshipment Terminal, Kochi. A pedestrian flyover platform connecting all the platforms to the nearby KSRTC bus station is being planned.

See also
 Ollur railway station
 Punkunnam railway station
 Guruvayur railway station
 Mulankunnathukavu railway station
 Thrissur Railway Passengers’ Association

References

External links

 The official website of Southern railway
 Thrissur Railway Station Numbers

 
Railway stations in Thrissur
Thiruvananthapuram railway division
Railway stations opened in 1902
Railway stations in Kerala